The Sea Island Open was a golf tournament on the LPGA Tour from 1954 to 1963. It was played in Sea Island, Georgia at the Sea Island Golf Club from 1954 to 1957 and 1963 and at the Cloister Country Club from 1958 to 1962.

Winners
Sea Island Women's Invitational
1963 Mickey Wright
1962 Mickey Wright

Sea Island Open
1961 Louise Suggs
1960 Mickey Wright
1959 No tournament
1958 Mickey Wright
1957 Mickey Wright
1956 Marlene Hagge
1955 Jackie Pung
1954 Louise Suggs

References

Former LPGA Tour events
Golf in Georgia (U.S. state)
Recurring sporting events established in 1954
Recurring sporting events disestablished in 1963
1954 establishments in Georgia (U.S. state)
1963 disestablishments in Georgia (U.S. state)
History of women in Georgia (U.S. state)